The Frosard W. Budington House is a historic home located in the Middleburg Historic District in Middleburg, Florida. It is located at 3916 Main Street. On March 9, 1990, it was added to the U.S. National Register of Historic Places.

It is a one-story Queen Anne-style house built in 1910.

References

External links
 Clay County listings at National Register of Historic Places
 Clay County listings at Florida's Office of Cultural and Historical Programs

National Register of Historic Places in Clay County, Florida
Houses on the National Register of Historic Places in Florida
Houses in Clay County, Florida
Queen Anne architecture in Florida